Gail Tsukiyama is an American novelist from San Francisco, California, USA.

Early life
Tsukiyama was born in San Francisco, to a Japanese father and a Chinese mother. She attended San Francisco State University, where she received both her Bachelor of Arts Degree and a Master of Arts Degree in English with an emphasis in creative writing.

Career 
Tsukiyama works as a part-time lecturer for San Francisco State University and a freelance book-reviewer for the San Francisco Chronicle. 

Tsukiyama is an alumna of the Ragdale Foundation. She lives in El Cerrito, California.

Works 
Tsukiyama was one of nine fiction authors to appear during the first Library of Congress National Book Festival. Her works include Women of the Silk (1991), The Samurai’s Garden (1995),  Night of Many Dreams (1998), The Language of Threads (1999), Dreaming Water (2002), The Street of a Thousand Blossoms (2007), A Hundred Flowers (2012), and The Color of Air (2020).

References

External links

 Literati.net: official Gail Tsukiyama website
  Bookreporter.com: Gail Tsukiyama profile
 US Library of Congress: 2001 National Book Festival webcast
 Facebook page

Living people
American women novelists
American literary critics
Women literary critics
American novelists of Asian descent
American women writers of Asian descent
American women writers of Chinese descent
American writers of Japanese descent
San Francisco Chronicle people
San Francisco State University alumni
San Francisco State University faculty
People from El Cerrito, California
Writers from San Francisco
20th-century American novelists
21st-century American novelists
20th-century American women writers
21st-century American women writers
PEN Oakland/Josephine Miles Literary Award winners
Novelists from California
American women non-fiction writers
20th-century American non-fiction writers
21st-century American non-fiction writers
Year of birth missing (living people)
American novelists of Chinese descent
American women critics